Elmo, stylized as elmo (the name is a blend of elastic and monkey), is a computer shogi evaluation function and book file (joseki) created by Makoto Takizawa. It is designed to be used with a third-party shogi alpha–beta search engine. 

Combined with the yaneura ou search, Elmo became the champion of the 27th annual World Computer Shogi Championship in May 2017.

In October 2017, DeepMind claimed that its program AlphaZero, after two hours of massively parallel training (700,000 steps or 10,300,000 games), began to exceed Elmo's performance. With a full nine hours of training (24 million games), AlphaZero defeated Elmo in a 100-game match, winning 90, losing 8, and drawing two.

Elmo is free software that may be run on shogi engine interface GUIs such as Shogidokoro and ShogiGUI.

Shogi theory

A new castle has appeared in computer games featuring elmo, which has been named elmo castle (エルモ囲い erumogakoi). Subsequently, the castle has been used by professional shogi players and recently featured in a book on a new Anti-Ranging Rook Rapid Attack strategy.

References

External links
 elmo Github page 
 YaneuraOu Github page 
 コンピュータ将棋ソフト「elmo」導入方法 · the elmo developer's how-to page 
 将棋フリーソフト レーティング: How to install Yaneuraou with third party evaluation files/opening books and Gikou2
Shogi software